The subcontrabass flute (also double contra-alto flute) is one of the largest instruments in the flute family, with tubing measuring over  long. The instrument is made either in the key of G, pitched a fourth below the contrabass flute in C and two octaves below the alto flute in G, or in F, pitched a fifth below the contrabass flute.

The subcontrabass flute is rarely used outside of flute ensembles. It is sometimes called the "gentle giant" of the flute family because of its gentle sound. At present, the subcontrabass flute is an instrument that must be custom ordered. It may be made out of PVC or metal.

This instrument's unique sound quality, dark tone, and at times sluggish articulation doesn't make this the best for a solo instrument due to the fact that it is very big and requires much air from the body. A workable range of two and a half octaves the instrument has some projection issues, though the Hogenhuis models designed from PVC can make a fine, vibrant and raucous tone when required. Due to the instrument's bore width (the diameter of the tube is approximately three inches), the sonic possibilities are almost endless, with excellent response to overtones, singing tones, and multiphonics (chord tones). C3–G3 sounds rich and it has great opportunities for dynamic power and accent. A3–D4 The tone becomes less secure and loses some of the lower partials and it is great for blending. E4–C5 has a weaker and somewhat unfocused pitch center which may be a good choice for blend or effect.

Naming
The double contra-alto flute (or contrabass flute), an instrument in the key of C pitched a fifth lower than the subcontrabass flute in G, is sometimes referred to as a subcontrabass flute.

Compositions
"And the Giant Began to Dance..." (Peter Sheridan), on the album Below: Music for Low Flutes.

References

Side-blown flutes
Contrabass instruments